Vandenberg Space Force Base Launch Facility 10 (LC-10) is a US Air Force Intercontinental ballistic missile launch facility on Vandenberg SFB, California, USA.  It is a launch site for the land-based LGM-30 Minuteman ICBMs.

References

Vandenberg Space Force Base